R56 may refer to:

Roads 
 R56 expressway (Czech Republic), now the D56 motorway
 R56 (South Africa)

Other uses 
 R-56 (rocket), a Soviet rocket design
  a destroyer of the Royal Navy
 Mini Hatch (R56), a car
 R-56 Nordholz, a former airfield of the United States Army Air Corps in Germany
 R56: Toxic to soil organisms, a risk phrase